Crosnier is a surname of French origin. People with this surname include:

 Antoine Cronier, or Crosnier (1732–), French clockmaker 
 Éric Crosnier (born 1972), French footballer
 François-Louis Crosnier (1792–1867), French politician and playwright

French-language surnames